The 2EL5 is a Ukrainian AC electric locomotive manufactured by Luhanskteplovoz. Ukrainian Railways leased 70 2EL5 locomotives in 2013, as replacements for Soviet-era VL8s.

References 

Electric locomotives of Ukraine